Luis Enrique Zamudio Lizardo Jr. (born June 24, 1998) is an American professional soccer player who plays as a goalkeeper for Major League Soccer club D.C. United.

Early life
Born in Las Vegas, Nevada, United States to Mexican parents, Zamudio holds double citizenship and is eligible to play for the United States or Mexico. Zamudio is a product of Sueño MLS, he participated in the 2015 MLS tryouts and reached the national finals after advancing from the Los Angeles leg.

Club career

Club América
Zamudio has been registered with America's first team since 2019, and was the third choice goalkeeper Guillermo Ochoa and Óscar Jiménez.

North Texas SC
On 7 February 2020, Zamudio joined USL League One side North Texas SC on a one-year contract with an option for the 2021 season. His contract option was declined by North Texas following their 2020 season.

Fort Lauderdale CF
In April 2021, Zamudio joined USL League One side Fort Lauderdale CF ahead of the 2021 season.

On July 7, 2021, Zamudio joined Miami FC on loan.

Loudoun United
Zamudio signed with USL Championship side Loudoun United ahead of their 2022 season.

References

External links

1998 births
Living people
Mexican footballers
American soccer players
Club América footballers
Liga Premier de México players
Association football goalkeepers
Soccer players from Las Vegas
American sportspeople of Mexican descent
North Texas SC players
USL League One players
Inter Miami CF II players
Miami FC players
Loudoun United FC players
Major League Soccer players
D.C. United players